Juan Salgado is a Chicago-based community leader. Since 2017, he has been chancellor of the City Colleges of Chicago. He is a 2015 recipient of a MacArthur Fellowship.

Salgado became President and CEO of the Instituto del Progreso Latino, an organization that helps low-income Latino immigrant communities in Chicago to achieve upward mobility through education and job placement, in 2001. Salgado ran the Manufacturing Works job training program, after he was commissioned to start the project for Chicago in 2002. After a trial period, the Manufacturing Works began operating in 2005.  In 2010, he opened a charter school called the Instituto Health Sciences Career Academy.

Salgado received his A.A. in 1989 from Moraine Valley Community College, a B.A. in 1991 from Illinois Wesleyan University and a Masters of Urban Planning (M.U.P.). in 1993 from the University of Illinois at Urbana-Champaign.

Salgado grew up in Calumet Park, Illinois to a father who was a steelworker and a mother who was a housewife.

Honors 
In 2010, Salgado was the recipient of the Mexican American Legal Defense and Education Fund Excellence in Community Service Award. In 2011, he was recognized as the White House Champion for Change in Social Innovation. In 2013, he was the speaker for Illinois Wesleyan's Commencement and received an honorary doctor of humane letters degree. He was named a MacArthur Fellow in 2015.

Family 
He is married and he and Leticia have three children.

References 

Living people
MacArthur Fellows
Year of birth missing (living people)